Alumni Football is the practice of playing American Football on behalf of your old alma mater.

History
Alumni football has been around for decades. While there have been a few high schools that have done an alumni football game, there have been several companies that have come and gone attempting to do alumni football games as a business. The first and only one that is still in business, Alumni Football USA, did their first game in 1985, and have done over 1300 games as of November 2016.

Current popularity
Starting in 2008, Alumni Football USA began spreading Alumni football games across the United States. Since then Alumni Football USA has done over 1000 Alumni football games in 30 states, raising almost $3,000,000 for schools and charities across the country.

Types of alumni football
There are usually two different types of alumni football. There is flag football and full contact football.

Values of the game
Alumni football is a modern-day revival of sorts. It has a value far beyond the game itself. It allows for players to reconnect with their football roots and brings teammates across the decades together on one team. Communities are brought together through this fun and exciting venue. Much needed funds are raised for specific needs of each unique community.

Legal issues
There is some legal discussion on whether schools are able to issue school gear to non-students. There are two main issues at debate.
 Does a school's insurance cover non-student adults playing in a sport on behalf of the school?
 In order to disperse equipment to adults that was meant for students, what safety precautions need to be taken in order to protect the student and the adult?
 Who is governing these safety issues? All equipment needs to be NOCSAE certified before it goes on the body of a student. If it is used after certification by an adult, it could be damaged and be unsafe for use on a student. This damage may not be visible to the eye. That is why reconditioning companies (with NOCSAE Certification) have special machines to test the safety of equipment.
Alumni Football USA owns 1200+ sets of football equipment. They are stationed in several areas of the country from Pittsburgh, Pennsylvania, to Nashville, Tennessee, to Chicago, Illinois, to Dallas, Texas, and Santa Rosa, California. There are 8 trailers with between 120 and 300 sets of gear in each depending on necessity. All equipment is new to as old as 7 years. All gear is purchased new, and they are the largest owner and purchaser of football related equipment in the world.

References

Variations of American football